Spencer Allen is an American baseball coach and former second baseman. He played college baseball at Green River College from 1997 to 1998 before transferring to Iowa State from 1999 to 2001 for head coach Lyle Smith. He then served as the head coach of the Northwestern Wildcats (2016–2021).

Playing career
Allen attended Capital High School in Olympia, Washington. Allen played for the school's varsity baseball team for three years. He was named a First Team All-Conference selection as a sophomore while playing the outfield. Allen then enrolled at the Green River College, to play college baseball for the Green River Gators baseball team.

As a redshirt freshman in 1998, Allen was named a 2nd Team All-Northwest Athletic Association of Community Colleges.

In the 2000 season as a junior, Allen had a .258 batting average, a .333 on-base percentage (OBP), and a .315 SLG, with ten RBIs.

Allen had his best season as a senior in 2001, hitting career highs in doubles (10), home runs (1), RBIs (17), batting average (.267) and slugging (.360).

Coaching career

Allen was hired by Northwestern after serving as an assistant for Illinois. On May 31, 2021, Allen resigned as the head coach of Northwestern.

Head coaching record

References

External links

Northwestern Wildcats bio

Living people
Baseball second basemen
Green River Gators baseball players
Creighton Bluejays baseball coaches
Illinois Fighting Illini baseball coaches
Iowa Hawkeyes baseball coaches
Iowa State Cyclones baseball players
Northwestern Wildcats baseball coaches
Purdue Boilermakers baseball coaches
Washington State Cougars baseball coaches
Sportspeople from Olympia, Washington
Baseball players from Washington (state)
1977 births
Edmonds Tritons baseball coaches